Feng Shui Family is a Taiwanese Hokkien television drama that began airing on Formosa Television in Taiwan on 17 July 2012 to 7 March 2014. The show aired in Taiwan every weeknight at prime time (20:00). The series was one of the longest running Taiwanese television dramas, with 426 episodes.

Plot
This drama depicts the two families turning against one another due to feng shui restrictions set by their ancestors. Under the conflicting pressure of materialism and values, can they lay down their personal views and embrace one another?

International broadcasts

Taiwan 
, the show airs in Taiwan, country of origin of the drama every weeknight at prime time (20:00) with episodes which have ranged in length from 135 to 150 minutes including commercial advertisements.  The producers received funding from the Government Information Office to produce the series in high definition. With admiration and some criticism, the show concluded on 17 July 2012, when the brand-new television drama of Formosa Television, was released.

Singapore
It is currently shown on Singapore's StarHub TV's Channel Hub E City on weekdays at 5pm and repeats at 10.30am. The show was dubbed into Mandarin during the broadcast.

Vietnam
The Vietnamese dub Phong Thuỷ Thế Gia was broadcast on Vinh Long Television Station Channel (THVL) (Vietnamese: Truyền Hình Vĩnh Long).

Cast

Chang Shu-wei as Ben, Lin Ming-ming's boyfriend
Chung Chia-chen as Lin Li-chu, Ben's mother
Chen Mei-feng as Lin Li-hua, Lin Li-chu's sister
Su Yen-pei as Tsai Hsiao-ping, Lin Ming-te's girlfriend
Yu An-shun as Tsai Fu-cheng, Tsai Hsiao-ping's father
Shara Lin as Ye Chia-yen
Chang Yung-hua as Ye Tsai-tien, Ye Chia-yen's father
Chen Sung-young as Chen Yung, Lin Chen Mei-mei's brother
Wang Chung-huang as Wang Chin-hu
Chang Chien as Chang Hsiao-chien, Wang Chin-hu's wife
Eison as Wang You-chiang, Wang Chin-hu's son
Weng Chia-ming as Chiang Tai-shan
Kao Chih-hung as Monkey
Bao Bao as Fatty
Chang Tsai-Hsing as Hsing

References

External links
Program webpage at Formosa Television website 

Taiwanese drama television series
Formosa Television original programming
2012 Taiwanese television series debuts
Hokkien-language television shows